British-Irish vocal pop group The Wanted have released three studio albums, one compilation album, two extended plays and fifteen singles. The band's debut album, The Wanted, was released by Geffen Records in the United Kingdom in October 2010. It reached number four on the UK Album Chart and number eleven on the Irish Albums Chart. The album's first single, "All Time Low", was released in July 2010 and peaked at number one on the UK Singles Chart and number thirteen on the Irish Singles Chart. This was followed by "Heart Vacancy", which reached two in the UK and eighteen in Ireland. "Lose My Mind", was the third and last single from the album and was less successful than its predecessors, reaching number 19 in the UK and number 30 in Ireland.

In March 2011, The Wanted released the official 2011 Comic Relief charity single, "Gold Forever", which peaked at number three in the UK and number 13 in Ireland. "Glad You Came", the Wanted's fifth single, was released in July 2011 and became their second number-one single in the UK and their first in Ireland; it also charted in the US, Australia, and Europe. In October, their sixth single, "Lightning", debuted and peaked at number 2 on 23 October 2011. This was followed by second album Battleground, which got to number 5.

In 2012, the band released "Chasing the Sun", the lead single from their then-untitled third studio album and the theme song of the animated film Ice Age: Continental Drift (2012). Four further singles were released, including top 5 hits "I Found You" and "Walks Like Rihanna", before long-awaited third album Word of Mouth finally dropped in November 2013. After the album only reached number 9 in the UK and number 17 in the US, the band announced an indefinite hiatus.

The band reunited in September 2021 and released their first greatest hits album in November 2021, which included two new songs.

Albums

Studio albums

Compilation albums

Extended plays

Singles

As lead artists

Promotional singles

Other charted songs

Other appearances

Music videos

References

External links
 

Pop music group discographies
Discographies of British artists
Discography
Discographies of Irish artists